Gretsch Drums is a division of American musical instrument manufacturer Gretsch. The company was founded in Brooklyn, New York, in 1883. Gretsch drum kits have been used by many notable drummers including Max Roach, Tony Williams, Art Blakey, Vinnie Colaiuta, Mark Guiliana, Phil Collins, Charlie Watts, Taylor Hawkins, Mitch Mitchell and Steve Ferrone.

Gretsch Drums manufactures and commercialises drum kits and hardware.

History 
Gretsch was founded by Friedrich Gretsch, a German immigrant who opened his own musical instrument shop on 128 Middleton Street in Brooklyn, New York in 1883. The operation moved to South 4th Street in 1894. After Friedrich's sudden death in 1895, his enterprising son, Fred Gretsch Sr., took over the business as a teenager. He expanded the business, adding Gretsch Building #1 at 109 South 5th Street in 1903, Gretsch Building #2 at 104–114 South 4th Street in 1910, and a new ten-story Gretsch Building #4 at 60 Broadway Street in 1916. The company ultimately owned or operated six properties in the immediate area, including a warehouse on Dunham Place. Gretsch Building #4 was owned by the Gretsch family until 1999, at which time it was sold and redeveloped into luxury condominiums.

Fred Gretsch Sr. handed over the family business to his son, Fred Gretsch Jr., after retiring in 1942. Soon after taking over, Fred Jr. left to serve in WWII as a Navy commander, leaving the business in the hands of his younger brother, William Walter "Bill" Gretsch. Bill Gretsch died in 1948 and the company was again run by Fred Jr.

Both guitars and drums were manufactured at 60 Broadway until the mid-1960s, at which time drum production was consolidated at 109 South 5th Street so that guitar production could be expanded.

Fred Gretsch Jr. ran the company until 1967 when Gretsch was sold to Baldwin Piano Co. In 1969 Baldwin moved Gretsch instrument manufacturing operations from Brooklyn to a plant in DeQueen, Arkansas.

In 1985 Gretsch was bought back by a member of the Gretsch family, Fred W. Gretsch, the son of the late William "Bill" Gretsch and great-grandson of original company founder Friedrich Gretsch. At that time drum production was relocated to Ridgeland, South Carolina, where it remains today.

In the late 1980s, Gretsch bought the remnants of the Slingerland Drum Company, which was later sold to Gibson, with Gretsch retaining the Leedy brand which had been part of the Slingerland purchase.

In 2000, Gretsch entered into an agreement with Kaman Music which granted them exclusive rights to manufacture Gretsch USA Custom and Signature drums. They also purchased the majority of the equipment used to make Gretsch drums.

In January 2015, the Lombardi Family announced that Drum Workshop had become the exclusive manufacturer and worldwide distributor of Gretsch Drums. Lombardi stressed that the factory in Ridgeland would remain open and that the Gretsch Family still owned the company.  And in 2017, Hal Leonard joined the Gretsch Drums Team as the exclusive US distributor of the Renown, Catalina, and Energy series drums.

Gretsch's Custom & Signature Series drums continue to be manufactured in Ridgeland, South Carolina, to this day.

Players
Some notable musicians that play/have played Gretsch drums are:

 Kees Konings
 Bill Bateman 
 Louis Bellson
 Mel Lewis
 Levon Helm
 DJ Fontana
 Jimmy Van Eaton
 Micky Dolenz
 Elvin Jones
 Shadow Wilson
 Chico Hamilton
 Sam Ulano
 Philly Joe Jones
 Will Calhoun
 Michael J Ilnicki
 Marino Colina
 Vinnie Colaiuta
 Matt Chamberlain
 Mark Guiliana
 Charlie Watts
 Max Roach
 Dannie Richmond
 Giampaolo Conchedda
 Ash Soan
 Tony Williams
 Phil Collins
 Stephanie Eulinberg
 Cindy Blackman
 Makoto Izumitani
 Daniel Davison
 Derek Kerswill
 Aaron Gillespie
 Zac Farro
 Tré Cool
 Ferit Odman
 Shawn Crahan
 Taylor Hawkins
 Chris Brien
 Hannah Ford Welton
 Brad Wilk
 Matt Sorum
 Stanton Moore
 Rob Bourdon
 DeWayne Quirico
 Archibald Ligonnière
 Mike Johnston
 Caleb Crosby (Tyler Bryant & the Shakedown)
 Richard Danielson (Vintage Trouble)
 Steve Ferrone
 Michael Gallaher
 Mitch Mitchell
 Larry Bunker (jazz and studio legend)
 Keith Carlock
 Nicole Pinto of Girls In Synthesis
 Rob Steele (Trampolene)
 Christophe Calpini
 Kimberley Thompson
 Joe Hammer (Space)
 Scott Underwood
 Paris Jeffree (Years & Years)
 Gerry Morgan (James Bay)
 Mario Ruiz

Badge History 

1883 to 1971 - The original Gretsch Round Badge design. This was the first badge used on Gretsch drums going all the way back to 1883. The badge was round with GRETSCH written across the top and DRUM MAKERS SINCE 1883 along the bottom. The Round Badge was attached to snare drums and bass drums using a standard brass grommet which also provided a vent-hole for the drum, but it was attached to tom-toms using a carpenter's upholstery tack which therefore left those drums unvented. Final production of Gretsch drums with the Round Badge was in 1971.
1971 to 1979 - The next badge design for Gretsch was an octagon-shaped badge. This brass badge had the GRETSCH logo written in block type with an elongated letter "T" in the middle of the Gretsch name. On the right side of the brass grommet, the word DRUMS appears in block letters. To the left, the initials U.S.A. appear in block letters. The bottom section of the badge reads "THAT GREAT GRETSCH SOUND". Final production of Gretsch Drums with this badge was in mid-1979. This is the only badge to carry the famous "Great Gretsch Sound" tag line.
1979 to 1980 - The second version of the octagon badge went into production in late 1979. This badge is very similar to the previous badge but the tag line on the bottom was changed back to "DRUM MAKERS SINCE 1883" in block letters.
1980 - A brief glimpse into the modern day drum badge. In 1980, due to the popularity of multiple-tom outfits, the badge was changed to a square shape with the corners cropped. This would allow the badge to look the same no matter which way the tom was mounted. The brass badge had the GRETSCH logo in block letters above the grommet. The GRETSCH logo below the grommet was placed upside down to allow for the varied positioning of the toms. U.S.A. was on the left and right side of the grommet with the left U.S.A. letters upside down. This badge would be used in 1980 and then shelved for a brief period of time before it was brought back into production.
Early 1981  - A short return to the octagon badge. This time the brass badge was redesigned with the GRETSCH logo in the drop "G" font above the grommet. U.S.A. appeared to the right of the grommet and DRUM MAKERS SINCE 1883 was at the bottom of this badge in block letters.
Late 1981 to 2012 - Back to the square badge design. By late 1981, the brass square badge had returned and is still being used on Gretsch Custom Drums today.
100th Anniversary Badge This special badge was used in 1983 on a limited production of exotic wood grain kits with all gold hardware. Only 100 sets in these special finishes were produced. The badge was a large upright rectangle with the corners cropped. The Gretsch logo features the drop "G" logo style and the badge reads "THE CENTENNIAL 1883–1983" along the top in block letters.
120th Anniversary Round Badge
Early 2013 to Modern Day Gretsch announced in late 2012 that they are going back to the round badge in early 2013.

See also 
 Gretsch
 List of drum makers

References

External links
 
 About Gretsch Drums

Companies based in South Carolina
Percussion instrument manufacturing companies
Music instrument endorsement lists
Musical instrument manufacturing companies of the United States